Tunshu is a  mountain in the Pariacaca mountain range in the Andes of Peru. It is located in the Junín Region, Jauja Province, Canchayllo District and in the Yauli Province, Suitucancha District. Tunshu lies north of Pariacaca and northwest of Tukumach'ay and the lake named Qarwaqucha. It is situated on the northern border of the Nor Yauyos-Cochas Landscape Reserve.

References

Mountains of Peru
Mountains of Junín Region